Central Coast FC is a Solomon Islands football club of Honiara, which plays in the Telekom S-League since 2020. Until 2019 they played in the Honiara Football League, but as of the 2020 season they play on the highest level in Solomon Islands. Besides football, the club also started as a futsal team. Its first training field was in the centre of Honiara, near the coast, but the team was created by people and footballers from Malaita.

Central Coast won their first Telekom S-League title in the 2021 season.

Current squad
''As of 4 August 2022. The following players were registered to their 2022 OFC Champions League squad:

External links 
 Official site on FB

References

Football clubs in the Solomon Islands
Honiara
Association football clubs established in 2020